Siphonofusus, also known as Waller's Whelk, is a genus of sea snails, marine gastropod mollusks in the family Buccinidae, the true whelks.

This genus is now considered a synonym of Euthria Gray, 1850

Species
Species within the genus Siphonofusus include:
 Siphonofusus chinensis (MacNeil, 1960)
 Siphonofusus vicdani Kosuge, 1992 
Species brought into synonymy
 Siphonofusus bradneri Drivas & Jay, 1990: synonym of Chryseofusus bradneri (Drivas & Jay, 1990)* 
 Siphonofusus brunobrianoi: synonym of Buccinulum brunobrianoi Parth, 1993
 Siphonofusus chrysodomoides: synonym of Chryseofusus chrysodomoides (Schepman, 1911)
 Siphonofusus somalicus Parth, 1999: synonym of Euthria somalica (Parth, 1999)

References

 Hadorn R. & Fraussen K. (1999) Rediscovery of Fusinus subangulatus (von Martens, 1903) and description of a new Somalian Fusinus (Gastropoda: Fasciolariidae), including some notes on the taxonomical position of the genus Siphonofusus Kuroda & Habe, 1952. Vita Marina 46(3-4): 111-122

Buccinidae